Iris cathayensis is a beardless iris in the genus Iris, in the subgenus Limniris and in the series Tenuifoliae of the genus. It is a rhizomatous herbaceous perennial, from China. It has grey-green leaves, short stems and violet flowers.

Description
Iris cathayensis has a brown, tough, knobbly rhizome. Which has dark red leaf bases (from last seasons leaves).

The tips of the leaves arch over.

Sometimes, the stems do not emerge from below ground.

It has membranous margins, visible mid-vein and pointed end.

It has 2 pairs of petals, 3 large sepals (outer petals), known as the 'falls' and 3 inner, smaller petals (or tepals, known as the 'standards'.

It has a 1.5–2 cm long, filiform (thread-like) pedicel, 7–9 cm long perianth tube, 2.8–3.5 cm long stamens, blue anthers and 1.3–1.5 long ovary.

After the iris has flowered, it produces a seed capsule (not described)  between June and August.

Biochemistry
In 2000, a chemical analysis of 22 species of iris from China was carried out. According to the distribution pattern of isoflavones in the species, they can be separated into 2 groups. One group contains  isoflavonoid aglycons and the other has glycosides and isoflavonoid aglycons. Iris cathayensis Migo and Iris mandshurica Pall. are considered intermediate groups between subgen. Limniris and Iris subg. Iris.

In 2005, a study was carried out to find out the chemical composition of Iris cathayensis. Using chromatography and spectroscopic methods, as well as others.

Taxonomy
It is written as 华夏鸢尾 in Chinese script and known as hua xia yuan wei in China.
 
It has the common name of 'China Iris', or Cathay Iris.

The Latin specific epithet cathayensis refers to Cathay, the Anglicized version of "Catai" and an alternative name for China.

It was published and described by Hisao Migo, in the 'Journal of the Shanghai Science Institute' Sect.3 Vol.4 on page 140 in 1939.

It was later published in 'Flora of Jiangsu', First Vol. 395, Fig. 712 in 1977.

Distribution and habitat
Iris cathayensis is native to temperate areas of Asia.

Range
It is found in the Chinese provinces of Anhui, Jiangsu, Hubei, and Zhejiang.

Habitat
It is found growing on open hillsides and grasslands, and low-altitude mountain meadow slopes.

Cultivation
Iris cathayensis is not common in cultivation in the UK.

It prefers to grow in sandy soils. It needs to be kept dry during winter, needing the protection of bulb frames, it only needs water during the growing season.

References

Citations

Other sources
 Mathew, B. 1981. The Iris. 122.
 Waddick, J. W. & Zhao Yu-tang. 1992. Iris of China.
 Wu Zheng-yi & P. H. Raven et al., eds. 1994–. Flora of China (English edition).

External links
 Many images of Chinese irises including Iris cathayensis
 Image of Iris cathayensis

cathayensis
Endemic flora of China
Flora of Anhui
Flora of Hubei
Flora of Jiangsu
Flora of Zhejiang
Garden plants of Asia
Plants described in 1939